The women's 400 metres at the 2015 World Championships in Athletics was held at the Beijing National Stadium on 24, 25 and 27 August. Christine Ohuruogu of Great Britain entered the competition as the defending champion.

Summary
Allyson Felix is known as a 200 metres specialist, but two years earlier her string of 200 meter championships was snapped along with her hamstring in the final.  Based on winning the 2014 Diamond League, Felix was qualified to enter the 200 metres here but chose to forgo that opportunity to put all her eggs in this basket.  This was her bid to win the one title she didn't have under her belt, the same event she narrowly lost to Amantle Montsho of Botswana four years prior at 2011 IAAF World Championships.  With world leader Francena McCorory unable to qualify to run here at the American Championships, Felix was the name to beat.  The defending champion Christine Ohuruogu, known for her late rush, also made the final.

With high expectations, Felix took off strongly running her first 200 metres in the dominant fashion one would expect of a 200 metres specialist.  She kept building on her lead coming off the final turn several steps ahead of Shericka Jackson the next out of the turn.  The question was if she would have the strength to finish, or would her legs turn to jello as happened to Sanya Richards-Ross with the same kind of aggressive start on this same track seven years earlier.	
The answer was no.  While Felix didn't advance her lead, she kept her margin on Jackson for a clear win.	
Shaunae Miller made a powerful rush to the finish, passing Jackson for the silver and gaining on Felix down the home stretch.  Jackson beat three other Jamaican teammates for the bronze.

Records
Prior to the competition, the records were as follows:

Qualification standards

Schedule

Results

Heats
Qualification: First 3 in each heat (Q) and the next 6 fastest (q) advanced to the semifinals.

Semifinals
Qualification: First 2 in each heat (Q) and the next 2 fastest (q) advanced to the final.

Final
The final was held at 20:40.

References

400
400 metres at the World Athletics Championships
2015 in women's athletics